ACMF may refer to:

 Allied Central Mediterranean Force, a force consisting of the US Fifth Army and the British Eighth Army during World War II.
 Adriamycin, Cyclophosphamide, Methotrexate, and 5-Fluorouracil, a chemotherapy regimen used in the treatment of breast cancer 
 Arachnoid Cysts of the Middle Fossa, the most common location where intracranial arachnoid cysts are found
 Adivasi Cobra Militant Force, a militant adivasi organization in Assam
 Antimatter/Antiproton Catalyzed Micro Fission/Fusion, a future technology being developed for long-distance space travel
 Two similarly named country music organizations use this acronym:
 Austrian Country Music Federation
 Australian Country Music Foundation